Percy Lee Snow (born November 5, 1967) is a retired American football linebacker who played at Michigan State University and was a first-round draft pick of the Kansas City Chiefs. Snow was a consensus selection on the 1989 College Football All-America Team at Michigan State and was voted the player of the game in the 1988 Rose Bowl. He is one of only four players in college football history to win both the Butkus Award and Lombardi Award. Snow was inducted into the College Football Hall of Fame in 2013.

NFL career
Snow had a successful rookie season in 1990 and was expected to be a major contributor to Marty Schottenheimer's powerful defense with the Kansas City Chiefs. However, he was involved in an accident while riding a scooter during training camp in 1991. Snow sustained season-ending injuries to his knee in the wreck and never fully recovered from the accident. His career ended after only three active seasons (he spent 1991 on injured reserve) with just one start in his final two.

After leaving the NFL, Snow later played for the Rhein Fire in the World League of American Football (WLAF).

Personal life
Snow is the older brother of Eric Snow, who played the National Basketball Association (NBA) from 1995 to 2008.

References

External links
 
 

Living people
1967 births
American football linebackers
Chicago Bears players
Kansas City Chiefs players
Michigan State Spartans football players
Rhein Fire players
All-American college football players
College Football Hall of Fame inductees
Players of American football from Canton, Ohio